The Halbert F. and Grace Neal House is a Queen Anne, cast concrete block house designed and constructed in 1905 by local contractor Ed Hartman in Meridian, Idaho, USA. The house was listed on the National Register of Historic Places October 19, 1982.

Halbert F. Neal graduated from medical school in Nebraska in 1904, and during his first year in Meridian he and his wife, Grace (Andrews) Neal, operated a pharmacy. Dr. Neal was Meridian's only resident physician for 28 years, and he served on the local school board.

References

External links

 Meridian Historic Walking Tour: The Neal House

Further reading
 Meridian: Halbert Fletcher Neal House Frank Thomason and Polly Ambrose Peterson (Arcadia Publishing, 2010), page 62
 Historic Meridian home on the market again... The Idaho Press-Tribune, September 16, 2018, page 8

National Register of Historic Places in Ada County, Idaho